13th Joseph Plateau Awards
1999

Best Film: 
 Rosie 
The 13th Joseph Plateau Awards honoured the best Belgian filmmaking of 1998 and 1999.

Winners and nominees

Best Belgian Actor
 Benoît Poelvoorde – The Carriers Are Waiting (Les convoyeurs attendent) 
Dirk Roofthooft – Rosie
Frank Vercruyssen – Rosie

Best Belgian Actress
 Aranka Coppens – Rosie 
Pascale Bal – The Wall (Le mur)
Sara de Roo – Rosie

Best Belgian Director
 Patrice Toye – Rosie 
Danny Deprez – The Ball (De bal)
Benoît Mariage – The Carriers Are Waiting (Les convoyeurs attendent)

Best Belgian Screenplay 1984–1999
Toto le héros  – Jaco Van Dormael
La promesse – Jean-Pierre and Luc Dardenne
Man Bites Dog – André Bonzel, Rémy Belvaux, Benoît Poelvoorde

Best Belgian Film
 Rosie 
The Ball (De bal)
The Carriers Are Waiting (Les convoyeurs attendent)

Best Belgian Series – Drama
 Heterdaad 
Recht op recht
Windkracht 10

Box Office Award
 Kabout Plop: De kabouterschat

Joseph Plateau Award of Honour
 Bonnie Arnold 
 Sandra Bullock 
 Peter Greenaway

Joseph Plateau Life Achievement Award
 Stanley Donen 
 Irwin Winkler 

1999 film awards